Mtonga is a surname of Zambian origin. Notable people with the surname include:

 Kondwani Mtonga (born 1986), Zambian footballer 
 Moffat Mtonga (born 1983), Zambian footballer

Zambian surnames
Malawian surnames